Aleksander Peretyagin (Александр Перетягин; born 2 February 1992 in Bratsk) is a Russian luger, lives in Chusovoy. He competed at the 2014 Winter Olympics

References

External links
 
 
 

1992 births
Living people
Russian male lugers
Olympic lugers of Russia
Lugers at the 2014 Winter Olympics
People from Chusovoy
Sportspeople from Perm Krai